Watergang (literally "watercourse") is a village in the northwest Netherlands. It is located in the municipality of Waterland, North Holland, about seven kilometres (four miles) north of Amsterdam, on the east bank of the Noordhollandsch Kanaal.

The village was first mentioned in 1343 as "van waterganghe", and means canal. It refers to the waterway between Monnickendam and Amsterdam. The canal developed during the peat excavation of the 12th century, and Watergang developed as a linear settlement along the canal. The Dutch Reformed church dates from 1642 and was restored in 1832.

People from Watergang
 Alexander Johan Berman, Dutch Reformed Minister of Watergang
 Simon Berman, Watergang-born mayor of Schagen, Bedum, and Alblasserdam

Gallery

References

Populated places in North Holland
Waterland